Simon Kuipers (born 9 August 1982) is a retired Dutch speed skater.  He won a 1500 meters World Cup competitions on 3 December 2005. It was his first World Cup victory. He participated in two events at the 2006 Winter Olympics in Turin,  finishing 23rd in the 500 metres, and 4th in the 1500 metres, less than four-tenths of a second off the podium, as well as being the fastest Dutchman in that event. He officially retired in March 2012.

Personal records

Source: SpeedskatingResults.com

Tournament overview

 DNS = Did not start
 DNF = Did not finish
 DQ = Disqualified
 NC = No classification

Medals won

References

External links
 
 
 
 
 

1982 births
Living people
Dutch male speed skaters
Speed skaters at the 2006 Winter Olympics
Speed skaters at the 2010 Winter Olympics
Olympic speed skaters of the Netherlands
Sportspeople from Haarlem
Olympic bronze medalists for the Netherlands
Olympic medalists in speed skating
Medalists at the 2010 Winter Olympics
World Sprint Speed Skating Championships medalists
20th-century Dutch people
21st-century Dutch people